In chemistry, a hemihydrate (or semihydrate) is a hydrate whose solid contains one molecule of water of crystallization per two other molecules, or per two unit cells.

References

Hydrates